Eric Mika (born January 5, 1995) is an American professional basketball player for the NBA G League Ignite of the NBA G League. Mika played collegiately at Brigham Young University (BYU).

High school career
Mika played at Waterford School his freshman and sophomore seasons before attending Lone Peak High School in Highland, Utah for his final 2 seasons. Mika help lead Lone Peak to a 26–1 record, the 2012-13 MaxPreps.com National Title and the 5A Utah state title with other future BYU Cougars Nick Emery and T.J. Haws.

College career
Mika played college basketball for BYU. He was named to the WCC All-Freshman Team and averaged double figures in points.

Mika returned to a BYU team and in his first season back from the mission field in 2016–17 he averaged 20.3 points and 9.2 rebounds a game. Mika was named to the All-West Coast Conference team.

Collegiate statistics

|-
| style="text-align:left;"| 2013–14
| style="text-align:left;"| BYU
| 33 || 28 || 25.5 || .527 ||     || .617 || 6.4 || 1.0 || 0.5 || 0.7 || 11.8
|-
| style="text-align:left;"| 2016–17
| style="text-align:left;"| BYU
| 34 || 34 || 28.6 || .528 || .000 || .763 || 9.2 || 1.6 || 0.6 || 1.9 || 20.3
|- class="sortbottom"
| style="text-align:center;" colspan="2"| Career
| 67 || 62 || 27.1 || .528 || .000 || .707 || 7.8 || 1.3 || 0.5 || 1.3 || 16.1

Professional career

Consultinvest Pesaro (2017–2018)
Mika declared for the 2017 NBA draft after his sophomore season. After going undrafted, Mika joined the Miami Heat for the NBA Summer League, then ultimately signed with Consultinvest Pesaro in Italy.

Basket Brescia Leonessa (2018–2019)
On July 9, 2018, Mika signed a deal with Basket Brescia Leonessa.

Medi Bayreuth (2019)
On January 8, 2019, Mika signed a contract with Medi Bayreuth of the German Basketball Bundesliga.

Stockton Kings (2019)
On August 20, 2019, Mika signed an Exhibit 10 contract with the Sacramento Kings. On October 11, 2019, Mika was waived by the Kings and ultimately included in the roster of Stockton Kings, NBA G League affiliate team of the Sacramento Kings.

Xinjiang Flying Tigers (2019)
On December 6, 2019, the Xinjiang Flying Tigers announced that they had added Mika to their roster. On December 27, 2019, Mika was removed from the roster of the Xinjiang Flying Tigers.

Second stint with Stockton Kings (2020)
On January 7, 2020, the Stockton Kings announced that they had acquired Mika.

Sacramento Kings (2020)
On February 1, 2020 Mika signed a 10-day contract with the Sacramento Kings. He made his NBA debut the same day, scoring six points with seven rebounds in 19 minutes as the Kings lost to the Los Angeles Lakers 129–113. On February 6, 2020, the Sacramento Kings announced that they had requested waiver on Mika.

Third stint with Stockton Kings (2020)
Mika was reported to have returned to Stockton Kings after being waived by the Sacramento Kings on February 6, 2020. He averaged  18.7 points and 11.9 rebounds per game in the 2019-20 season.

Partizan Belgrade (2020–2021)
On August 24, 2020 Mika signed a contract with the Partizan. He averaged 7.9 points, 3.4 rebounds, and 1.4 assists per game.

JL Bourg (2021–2022)
On July 1, 2021, Mika signed with JL Bourg of LNB Pro A.

NBA G League Ignite (2022–present)
On September 28, 2022, Mika signed with the NBA G League Ignite. He was named to the G League's inaugural Next Up Game for the 2022–23 season.

Personal
Mika served as a missionary for the Church of Jesus Christ of Latter-day Saints for two years in Rome, Italy between his freshman and sophomore years of college.

Career statistics

NBA

Regular season

|-
| style="text-align:left;"|
| style="text-align:left;"|Sacramento
| 1 || 0 || 19.0 || .667 || - || 1.000 || 7.0 || .0 || .0 || .0 || 6.0
|- class="sortbottom"
| style="text-align:center;" colspan="2"|Career
| 1 || 0 || 19.0 || .667 || - || 1.000 || 7.0 || .0 || .0 || .0 || 6.0

College

|-
| style="text-align:left;"| 2013-14
| style="text-align:left;"| BYU
| 33 || 28 || 25.5 || .527 || - || .617 || 6.4 || 1.0 || 0.5 || 0.7 || 11.8
|-
| style="text-align:left;"| 2016-17
| style="text-align:left;"| BYU
| 34 || 34 || 28.6 || .528 || .000 || .763 || 9.2 || 1.6 || 0.6 || 1.9 || 20.3 
|- class="sortbottom"
| style="text-align:center;" colspan="2"|Career
| 67 || 62 || 27.1 || .528 || .000 || .707 || 7.8 || 1.3 || 0.5 || 1.3|| 16.1

References

External links
LBA profile
BYU Cougars bio

1995 births
Living people
21st-century Mormon missionaries
American expatriate basketball people in China
American expatriate basketball people in Germany
American expatriate basketball people in Italy
American expatriate basketball people in Serbia
American men's basketball players
Basket Brescia Leonessa players
Basketball players from Salt Lake City
BYU Cougars men's basketball players
Centers (basketball)
JL Bourg-en-Bresse players
KK Partizan players
Latter Day Saints from Utah
Lega Basket Serie A players
Medi Bayreuth players
Mormon missionaries in Italy
NBA G League Ignite players
People from Highland, Utah
Power forwards (basketball)
Sacramento Kings players
Stockton Kings players
Victoria Libertas Pallacanestro players
Xinjiang Flying Tigers players
Undrafted National Basketball Association players
United States men's national basketball team players